Montevideo airport may refer to:

 Carrasco International Airport, the largest airport in Uruguay, located in Montevideo
 Montevideo-Chippewa County Airport, Minnesota, USA